Procedure may refer to:

 Medical procedure
 Instructions or recipes, a set of commands that show how to achieve some result, such as to prepare or make something
 Procedure (business), specifying parts of a business process  
 Standard operating procedure, a step-by-step instruction to achieve some result, used in industry and military
 Legal procedure, the body of law and rules used in the administration of justice in the court system, including:
 Civil procedure
 Criminal procedure
 Administrative procedure
 Parliamentary procedure, a set of rules governing meetings
 Procedure (computer science), also termed a subroutine, function, or subprogram
 Stored procedure, a subroutine in the data dictionary of a relational database
 The Procedure, an American hardcore band

See also
 Procedural (disambiguation)